Aprominta cryptogamarum is a moth of the family Autostichidae. It is found in France, Italy and Spain.

References

Moths described in 1872
Aprominta
Moths of Europe